Omar Sakr (born 22 November 1989) is a contemporary Arab-Australian poet, novelist and essayist.

Career
Sakr has been a published poet since 2014, with over 80 poems appearing in literary journals including Meanjin, Overland  and other publications. His first book of poetry These Wild Houses was published in 2017 by Cordite Books.

In 2020, he was the first Arab-Australian Muslim to be shortlisted for and then win the prestigious Prime Minister's Literary Award for poetry for his book The Lost Arabs. The judging panel described The Lost Arabs as a collection of “vital, energy-driven poems” that “speak with a clear and fearless voice, a voice that is often passionate and sometimes angry, but always lucid and warmly human."

His first novel “Son of Sin” was published by Affirm Press in 2022. Rafqa Touma in The Guardian described in as “laced with charm, candor and a vital sense of warmth”. Sakr's work has been translated into Arabic and Spanish and he was the poetry editor of The Lifted Brow from 2017 to 2020. In 2022, Sakr was named by The Australian as one of the top 100 cultural leaders in the arts. 
His next poetry collection Non-Essential Work will be published by University of Queensland Press.

Personal life
Sakr was born to immigrant Turkish-Lebanese parents in Western Sydney, where he still lives. He attended Liverpool Boys High, received his BA in communication from the University of Technology, Sydney in 2010 and his Master in Creative Writing from the University of Sydney in 2013. 
Sakr is bisexual 

In 2019, Sakr was part of the Big Anxiety festival, where he spoke of how he had experienced anxiety and depression as he navigated his sexuality in a religious household, and how writing poetry had allowed him to channel his feelings and "take the pain in my life and transform it into something beautiful."

Awards
 These Wild Houses  was shortlisted for the Judith Wright Calanthe Award, Anne Elder Award and the Kenneth Slessor Prize for Poetry.  
 The Lost Arabs won the Prime Minister's Literary Award and was shortlisted for the Judith Wright Calanthe Award, the John Bray Poetry Award,the NSW Premier's Literary Awards and the Colin Roderick Award. 
 In 2019, Sakr was the recipient of the Edward Stanley Award for Poetry, and in 2020, the Woollahra Digital Literary Award for Poetry.
 Son of Sin was shortlisted for the Debut fiction prize at the 2023 Indie Book Awards.

Books
Son of Sin (Affirm Press, 2022)
The Lost Arabs (University of Queensland Press, 2019)
These Wild Houses (Cordite Books, 2017)

Short stories
“White Flu” in After Australia (Affirm Press, 2020)
“An Arab Werewolf” in Liverpool in Kindred: 12 Queer YA Stories (Walker, 2019)

References

External links

1989 births
University of New South Wales alumni
Australian male novelists
Living people
Writers from New South Wales
21st-century LGBT people
21st-century Australian novelists
Australian LGBT novelists